Vivaldi Network Coordinates establish a virtual positioning system that has a prime use in networking. The algorithm behind the system uses a distributed technique to estimate propagation times between peers in the network.

Through this scheme, network topology awareness can be used to tune the network behaviour to more efficiently distribute data.  For example, in a peer-to-peer network, more responsive identification and delivery of content can be achieved. In the Azureus application, Vivaldi is used to improve the performance of the distributed hash table that facilitates query matches.

Advantages 
 Vivaldi is a fully distributed scheme, which achieves good scalability.
 The Vivaldi algorithm is simple and easy to implement.

Drawbacks 
 Vivaldi is based on the Euclidean distance model, which requires the predicted distances to obey the triangle inequality. However, there are many triangle inequality violations (TIVs) on the Internet.
 Lack of security design, very easy for malicious nodes to conduct various attacks.

See also 
 Pharos Network Coordinates
 Phoenix Network Coordinates

External links
 Simulator for Decentralized Network Coordinate Algorithms (NCSim)
 Practical, Distributed Network Coordinates (original paper)
 Azureus Wiki Overview

Computer networking